Children of Paradise is the twelfth studio album by American singer and songwriter Willie Nile. It was released on 27 July 2018 by River House Records. Nile says of the album, "The music always lifts my spirits, and that's what these songs do for me and it's why I wrote them. Hopefully they can lift others’ spirits as well." "I believe in the basic goodness of most people, and that's where these songs come from."

Background
On 24 February 2018, Nile posted a video on PledgeMusic announcing his upcoming album. Nile said that he had been doing a lot of songwriting and that he was going to make a studio album of all original material. Nile dedicated the album to his longtime friend Andrew Dorff who co-wrote Lookin’ For Someone. Dorff died unexpectedly at age 40 shortly after the song was written.

Critical reviews
Associated Press’ Kiley Armstrong says it is "his best album to date". 
In a July 2018 review of the album Audiophile says "Willie Nile has a lot to say and clearly some great songs in his back pocket. You just need to listen. If you have even a bit of conscience remaining, you should listen to Willie's albums of the last 10 years or so. You might just get inspired by his 21st century renaissance." Lee Zimmerman writes in Paste "A new waive of politically charged music from Nile. With its cascading choruses, rousing refrains and cover photos of some of the homeless people that inhabit his neighborhood, Children of Paradise serves as his own call to arms." Rock nyc says "a brilliant collection of punk-folk attitude songs, politically astute and sweet and sour at the same time as he adds the subjective to the objective".

Track listing

Personnel
Musicians
 Willie Nile – acoustic and electric guitars, piano, vocals
 Johnny Pisano – bass, backing vocals
 Matt Hogan – electric guitar
 Jon Weber – drum
 Steuart Smith – acoustic and electric guitars, mandolin, harmonium, Hammond B3, Wurlitzer, glockenspiel
 Andy Burton – Hammond B3
 Frankie Lee – tambourine, backing vocals
 James Maddock – backing vocals
 Leslie Mendelson – backing vocals
Production and additional personnel
 Produced by Stewart Lerman and Willie Nile
 Executive Producer: Kevin Collins
 Associate Producer: Barry LaPorte
 Engineered by James Frazee and Stewart Lerman
 Mixed by Stewart Lerman 
 Recorded at Hobo Sound, Weehawken, NJ
 Mastering by Greg Calbi at Sterling Sound, NYC
 Art direction – Deborah Maniaci
 Photography – Cristina Arrigoni at CristinaArrigoniphotography.com
 Legal – Terri Baker, Esq 
 Media – Cary Baker – conqueroo.com
 Booking – Adam Bauer at Madison-House Agency

Charts

Release history

References

External links
Official Website

2018 albums
Willie Nile albums
Albums produced by Stewart Lerman